Abul Hasanat Abdullah (born 10 December 1944) is a Bangladesh Awami League politician and a member of parliament for constituency Barisal-1.

Career 
Abdullah was elected Upazila Chairman in Barisal in 1973.

In 1975, his father, Abdur Rab Serniabat, was killed in the 15 August 1975 Bangladesh coup d'état. He and his family members fled Bangladesh. The new Government of Bangladesh declared his land vested property and took over them. In 2001, the land was returned to him. Gournadi Pourasabha Bangladesh Nationalist Party president Hannan Sharif announced the 25 decimals of the property belonged to Roads and Highways Department according to the records of the Land Revenue Department. Sharif started building the local office of the Bangladesh Nationalist Party office with the permission of Upazila Nirbahi Officer Mahfuzur Rahman.

Abdullah was elected to parliament from Barisal-1.

On 26 January 2000, Abdullah was appointed member of the parliamentary standing committee for home ministry. He served as the chief whip of parliament at the Awami league government from 1996 to 2001.

In October 2002, during Operation Clean Heart, Abdullah's house in Barisal City was raided by security personal led by Major Akbor and Major Shariar. The police recovered two guns, bullets, Tk 613 thousand in cash, gold ornaments, and 355 blank freedom fighter certificate.

Abdullah was the general secretary of Barisal District unit of Bangladesh Awami League. On 12 November 2007, his properties from his house in 25, Kalabagan Lake Circus Road in Dhanmondi were attached to Dhanmondi Police Station on court orders.

In 2008, Abdullah was nominated by Bangladesh Awami League in Barisal-1 and Barisal-2. His nomination was opposed by local activists of Bangladesh Awami League, who wanted more popular candidates.

On 11 June 2009, Awami League government dropped 62 legal cases against Awami League politicians including four against Abdullah.

On 24 March 2014, Abdullah was accused of facilitating the victory of Golam Mortuja Khan in the Upazlia Chairman election through vote rigging.

Abdullah was elected to Jatiya Sangsad from Barisal-1 constituency in 2014 and again in 2018. On 18 January 2018, he was made the convener of the National Committee on Chittagong Hill Tracts with the rank of a government minister.

Personal life 
Abdullah's father is former Awami league leader and water resource minister Abdur Rab Serniabat, who was killed in the assassination of Sheikh Mujib. His mother and siblings were also killed in the coup. His son, Serniabat Sadiq Abdullah, was elected mayor of Barisal on 30 July 2018. He is a cousin of Prime Minister Sheikh Hasina.

References

Living people
1944 births
Awami League politicians
Sheikh Mujibur Rahman family
11th Jatiya Sangsad members
10th Jatiya Sangsad members
7th Jatiya Sangsad members
5th Jatiya Sangsad members
Bangladeshi people of Arab descent